Černčice refers to the following places in the Czech Republic:

 Černčice (Louny District), a village in Louny District
 Černčice (Náchod District), a village in Náchod District